The Pegasus class is a series of 14 container ships. Six ships were built by Samsung Heavy Industries for the Singapore based Eastern Pacific Shipping. Another six ships were built by Daewoo Shipbuilding and Marine Engineering for Minsheng Financial Leasing and China Bank of Communications Financial Leasing. The last two ships are built by Hyundai Heavy Industries and are owned by Ship Finance International. The 14 ships are operated by Mediterranean Shipping Company. The ships have a maximum theoretical capacity of 19,368 twenty-foot equivalent units (TEU) to 19,462 TEU.

The class is made up of three series of ships, each built at a different shipyard. The ships are all similar in size but do have a somewhat different design. The ships are chartered to MSC by various companies.

List of ships

See also

References 

Container ship classes
Ships built by Hyundai Heavy Industries Group
Ships built by Samsung Heavy Industries
Ships built by Daewoo Shipbuilding & Marine Engineering